Alexander Bangsoy (born July 2, 1966) is a Filipino entrepreneur and the Chairman of the board and Chief Executive Officer of Goshen Land Capital Inc., a real estate company in Northern Luzon, Philippines.

He was nominated as an Ernst & Young Entrepreneur of the Year 2013 by the Philippine Stock Exchange (PSE) and he went on to be one of the top 12 finalists for the award.

Biography

Alexander Bangsoy is the son of Igorot house-helpers from Mountain Province who worked in Manila.  They handled a sari-sari store, traded knitting yarns  and knitted wares . They recycled the refuse of hosiery factories in Pasig in the 70s and Alexander helped sell these at Baclaran. When he was 11 years old, Bangsoy opened his own comic book rental venture in their neighborhood where he learned the crucial factors of inventory tracking and turn-over.

In 1983, Bangsoy's family was forced to return home to Baguio when they were ejected from their rented home at La Felonila, Quezon City with all their belongings thrown out on the street in full view of their neighbors. This motivated Bangsoy to become a lawyer and later on, build homes for Filipinos like him.

To support his education, Bangsoy's father worked as an OFW cook at Dammam, Saudi Arabia while his mother traded vegetables and knitted wares. While studying at the Ateneo Law School, Alexander sold knitted cardigans to his classmates, friends and in Manila trade fairs. During vacation, he sold knitted wares in their market stall and along Baguio's sidewalks.

In law practice, he dabbled in property junkyard deals of legally-distressed properties which led him to enroll at  the Asian Institute of Management (AIM) for Master in Entrepreneurship (ME). He established Goshen Land Capital Inc. in 2007 which introduced master planned student condominiums, investment lots and other real estate properties.

Education

Took up Bachelor of Science in Accounting as his undergraduate course at Saint Louis University and graduated in 1986.

A Graduate of the Ateneo College of Law in 1991 with a degree of Doctor in Jurisprudence (JD), he passed the bar exam the following year.

Took up his Masters in Entrepreneurship at Asian Institute of Management (AIM) and graduated in 2007.

Finished the Owner/President Management Program Batch 45 at the Harvard Business School in Boston U.S.A. in 2013.

Enrolled at Kellogg School of Management for the Accelerating Sales Force Performance (September–October 2013).

Work history
1990 – associate lawyer Balgos and Perez Law Firm;
1991–1992 – associate lawyer, Tanjuatco Oreta Berenguer law office;
1992–2005 – private law practice Baguio;
2004–2008 – legal consultant NAPOCOR;
2004–present – CEO and president of TBF Realty and Goshen Land Capital Inc.

References

1966 births
Filipino chief executives
20th-century Filipino lawyers
Living people
Saint Louis University (Philippines) alumni
Ateneo de Manila University alumni
Asian Institute of Management alumni
21st-century Filipino lawyers